Pachyornis is an extinct genus of ratites from New Zealand which belonged to the moa family. Like all ratites it was a member of the order Struthioniformes. The Struthioniformes are flightless birds with a sternum without a keel.  They also have a distinctive palate. This genus contains three species, and are part of the Anomalopteryginae or lesser moa subfamily. Pachyornis moa were the stoutest and most heavy-legged genus of the family, the most notable species being Pachyornis elephantopus - the heavy-footed moa. They were generally similar to the eastern moa or the broad-billed moa of the genus Euryapteryx, but differed in having a pointed bill and being more heavyset in general. At least one species (P. australis) is assumed to have had a crest of long feathers on its head. The species became rapidly extinct following human colonization of New Zealand, with the possible exception of P. australis, which may have already been extinct by then - although the most recent moa skeleton ever described is a partial skeleton of this species, radiocarbon dated to between 1396 and 1442. 

Two new genetic lineages, which may eventually be described as new species, are now known to have existed, one each from New Zealand's North and South Island.

References

Bibliography

External links

 NZBirds

Bird genera
Ratites
Holocene extinctions
Extinct birds of New Zealand